The following is a list of video games that feature cooperative gameplay, either as a primary or secondary gameplay mode.

List

See also
 List of cooperative Xbox 360 games

References

 
Video game gameplay
Video game lists by technology or feature